Jack Schrade (May 25, 1902 – April 14, 1992) was an American politician. He served as a Republican member for the 80th district of the California State Assembly. He also served as a member for the 39th and 40th district of the California State Senate.

Life and career 
Schrade was born in Williamsport, Pennsylvania.

In 1955, Schrade was elected to represent the 80th district of the California State Assembly, serving until 1963. In the same year, he was elected to represent the 40th district of the California State Senate, serving until 1967, when he was elected to represent the 39th district, serving until 1976.

Schrade died in April 1992 in Yolo County, California, at the age of 89.

References 

1902 births
1992 deaths
Politicians from Williamsport, Pennsylvania
Republican Party members of the California State Assembly
Republican Party California state senators
20th-century American politicians
Year of birth missing